Darrell Hedric (born June 9, 1933) is an American basketball head coach and scout, most noted as the coach of the Miami University (Ohio) basketball team from 1970 to 1984.

Early history
Hedric was born and raised in Franklin, Ohio. He was a standout on the Franklin Wildcats basketball team. During his senior year, he was recruited to play college basketball at Miami University the following year. Hedric went on to gain his varsity letter in all four years at Miami.

After graduation, Hedric played professional basketball for the Akron Goodyear Wingfoots of the National Industrial Basketball League. He was drafted into the United States Navy and served on a destroyer in Antarctica. After serving his country, Hedric once again turned to basketball, taking the head coaching job at Taft High School in Hamilton, Ohio.

Miami University coaching history
Subsequently, Hedric returned to Miami University to serve as an assistant coach. In 1970 Hedric took the reins of the school's basketball program as the head coach, a position he held until 1984. By the end of his coaching career, he amassed several notable achievements including defeating defending national champion  Marquette in the NCAA tournament, and regular season wins over coaching legends Bobby Knight and Dean Smith. Hedric remains the only coach to have defeated both Knight and Smith on their home courts.

Hedric compiled a record of 216–157 at Miami, and along the way recruited several excellent players, most notably Ron Harper, who went on to win multiple NBA championships.

He was inducted into the Miami Athletic Hall of Fame in 1978, and in 1986 Miami retired his jersey #86. He is an inductee of the Franklin and Butler County Halls of Fame. He was inducted into the Ohio Basketball Hall of Fame in 2012.

References

1933 births
Living people
American men's basketball coaches
American men's basketball players
Basketball coaches from Ohio
Basketball players from Ohio
College men's basketball head coaches in the United States
Miami RedHawks men's basketball coaches
Miami RedHawks men's basketball players
People from Franklin, Ohio
Sportspeople from Hamilton, Ohio